Parapteronotus hasemani, the duckbill knifefish, is a species of ghost knifefish found in main river channels and along the margins in the Amazon basin of Brazil and Peru. It is the only member of its genus.

Named in honor of John D. Haseman (1887-1969), field collector in the Carnegie Museum of Natural History’s Department of Ichthyology from 1908 to 1911, who collected the type specimen.

References

Apteronotidae
Taxa named by James S. Albert
Taxa named by Max Mapes Ellis
Fish of South America
Fish of Brazil
Fish of Peru
Fish described in 1913
Monotypic freshwater fish genera